This is the list of episodes of The Late Show with Stephen Colbert that aired in 2015.

2015

September

October

November

December

References

External links
 
 Lineups at Interbridge 
 

Episodes 2015
2015 American television seasons
Lists of American non-fiction television series episodes
Lists of variety television series episodes